Food Lover’s Companion is a book containing culinary terminology and conversion tables for cooking. Five editions have been published as of 2019.

The main section of the work is an A-to-Z list of defined culinary terminology, followed by a series of appendices.

The Second Edition is a searchable source text at Epicurious, and the Third Edition is a searchable source text at Answers.com.

Sharon Tyler Herbst—the primary author—wrote 16 food and beverage related books before her death on 26 January 2007.  Her husband Ron—who writes about wine and cheese—finished editing the Fourth Edition after her death and is credited as the coauthor.

Reception
Bon Appetit hailed the book as "one of the best reference books we’ve seen, a must for every cook’s library", and The New York Times described it "As thick and as satisfying as a well-stuffed sandwich".

Famous chef Emeril Lagasse called it his favorite book, and it is required reading at the New England Culinary Institute.

Deluxe edition
After the 2007 edition was published, Ron Herbst and the staff of Barron's Educational Series drastically reorganized the book, breaking out much of the material into specialized glossaries on subjects like chocolate, liqueurs, charcuterie, and spices. This edition was published in hardcover as The Deluxe Food Lover's Companion and included a marker ribbon bound into the spine. The 2013 fifth edition received a similar treatment in April 2015.

Fourth edition appendices
In the deluxe editions, some of these have been folded into the glossary sections.

 Ingredient Equivalents – Weight to volume conversions
 Substituting Ingredients
 Pan Substitution Chart
 High-Altitude Baking Adjustments
 Boiling Point of Water at Various Altitudes
 General Temperature Equivalents
 Hand Test for Grilling Temperatures
 Oven Temperatures
 Fahrenheit/Celsius Conversion Formulas
 Microwave Oven Conversion Chart
 Recommended Safe Cooking Temperatures
 Candymaking Cold-Water Tests
 Frying Temperatures
 Smoke Points of Popular Oils
 Fatty Acid Profiles of Popular Oils
 U.S. Measurement Equivalents
 Wine and Spirit Bottle Sizes
 Approximate Metric Equivalents
 Metric Conversion Formulas
 Food Guide Pyramid
 What's a Serving?
 Food Label Terms
 A Guide to Food Labels
 Pasta Glossary
 British and American Food and Cooking Terms
 Seasoning Suggestions
 Meat Charts
 Food Additives Directory

See also
Larousse Gastronomique
Le Répertoire de la Cuisine

Notes

External links
 Food Lover’s Companion, 3rd Ed. at Answers.com.

1990 non-fiction books
1995 non-fiction books
2001 non-fiction books
2007 non-fiction books
Cookbooks
Dictionaries by subject